The Journal of Cases on Information Technology (JCIT) is a quarterly peer-reviewed applied research academic journal which focuses on information technology. It is published by IGI Global. The journal was established in 1999.

Abstracting and indexing
The journal is abstracted and indexed by the following, among others:

ACM Digital Library
Compendex
DBLP
Inspec
Scopus
Web of Science: Emerging Sources Citation Index (ESCI)

References

External links
 

Publications established in 1999
English-language journals
Quarterly journals
Cases on Information Technology, Journal of
Computer science journals